Lucía Daniela Fresco (born 14 May 1991, in Chajarí) is an Argentine volleyball player.

Career 
She has been a part of the Argentina national team since 2009, appearing at the Pan-American Volleyball Cup (in 2009, 2010, 2011, 2012, 2013, 2015, 2016), the FIVB Volleyball World Grand Prix (in 2011, 2012, 2013, 2014, 2015, 2016), the FIVB Volleyball Women's World Cup (in 2011, 2015), the 2014 FIVB Volleyball Women's World Championship in Italy, 2018 FIVB Volleyball Women's World Championship, the 2015 Pan American Games in Canada, and the 2016 Summer Olympics in Brazil. In the 2019 Pan American Games in Peru, Fresco won the bronze medal and was chosen as the tournament's best opposite.

Nicknamed as 'la Rusa' (literally 'the Russian') by the Argentine press, she resumed playing in August 2014, after recovering from a right shoulder surgery which kept her inactive for almost a year. 
At club level, Fresco played for Club Santa Rosa (in her native town of Chajarí), Boca Juniors, Sportclub Potsdam, Urbino and Soverato before moving to Pannaxiakos in September 2016. In 2017, she was hired by Békéscsabai RSE of the Hungarian league. In 2019 she returned to Boca Juniors (Arg.) and her team was champion, with Fresco being the best player.

Clubs
  Club Santa Rosa Chajarí (2003–2009)
  Boca Juniors (2009–2011)
  SC Potsdam (2011–2014)
  Tiboni Urbino (2014–2015)
  Volley Soverato (2015–2016)
  AON Pannaxiakos Naxos (2016–17)
  Békéscsabai RSE (2017–2019)
  Boca Juniors (2019–2019)
  Incheon Heungkuk Life Pink Spiders (2019 present)

References

External links
 Profile at CEV
 Profile  at Lega Pallavolo Serie A Femminile (Italian Serie A)

1991 births
Living people
Argentine women's volleyball players
Sportspeople from Entre Ríos Province
Volleyball players at the 2015 Pan American Games
Volleyball players at the 2019 Pan American Games
Olympic volleyball players of Argentina
Volleyball players at the 2016 Summer Olympics
Opposite hitters
Pan American Games medalists in volleyball
Pan American Games bronze medalists for Argentina
Medalists at the 2019 Pan American Games